The 1994 Moroccan census was held in Morocco in 1994. The census was conducted by the High Planning Commission.

References

External links
Census results (population)

Censuses in Morocco
1994 in Morocco